Angelo Bertell Fields (born September 15, 1957) is a former offensive tackle in the NFL for the Houston Oilers. He was a second round draft pick in the 1980 NFL Draft out of Michigan State University.

Football career
Fields was born in Washington D.C. where he attended Woodrow Wilson High School. Recruited to play collegiate football for Michigan State in 1976 where he played both offensive tackle and defensive tackle. During his time with the Spartans, Fields played alongside both Dan Bass and Larry Bethea. In 1977 MSU went 7-3-1 and in 1978 Michigan State won the Big Ten championship. However, the Spartans were on NCAA probation and unable to attend the Rose Bowl. Fields stood out due to his strength and agility. He was drafted in the second round of the 1980 NFL Draft by the Houston Oilers with whom he played three seasons before being released.

References
 NFL database, Angelo Fields
 NFL reference, Angelo Fields

1957 births
Living people
American football offensive linemen
Houston Oilers players
Michigan State Spartans football players
Players of American football from Washington, D.C.
Woodrow Wilson High School (Washington, D.C.) alumni
Green Bay Packers players